The National Division is the highest football league in Luxembourg.  Until 2011, it was known as the BGL Ligue, after the Luxembourg Football Federation managed to seal a sponsorship deal with Fortis.  Before 2006, it contained twelve teams, but it expanded to fourteen for the 2006–07 season. Following the abandonment of the previous season, the 2020–21 season saw the further expansion of the league to 16 teams. The current champions are F91 Dudelange.

The competition was first held in 1909–10, and has been held every year since, with the exceptions of 1912–13 and four seasons during the Second World War. The competition was called the Luxembourgish Championship until 1913–14. From the 1914–15 season until 1931–32 it was called the Premier Division. It was then called the Division of Honour from 1932–33 to 1956–57. Since the 1957–58 season, the competition has been known as the National Division. Presently, the representatives of the National Division occupy three bottom places in the UEFA all-time Champions League table.

Winners
Champions were (team names in French):

Statistics

Performance by club
Teams in italics no longer exist.

Top scorers

References

External links
Federation website (French)
League at fifa.com

 
1
Top level football leagues in Europe
Sports leagues established in 1909